‘Izz al-Dīn Abū Sanad Jammāz ibn Shīḥah ibn Hāshim al-Ḥusaynī was the Husaynid Emir of Medina from 1259 to 1300. He was preceded as Emir by his brother Munif, during whose reign he played a supportive role. He succeeded to the Emirate after Munif's death in 657 AH (1259). In 666 AH (1267/1268) he was deposed by his nephew Malik ibn Munif. The Emir of Mecca and others from among the Bedouin came to his aid, but they were unable to unseat Malik. After their departure Malik relented and returned the Emirate to his uncle. Jammaz continued as Emir until he abdicated in favor of his son Mansur in early 700 AH (1300). He died in Safar 704 AH (September/October 1304).

References

1304 deaths
Year of birth unknown
People from Medina
13th-century rulers in Asia
Sharifs of Medina
13th-century births
13th-century Arabs
14th-century Arabs
Husaynids